Boracifero Lake is a lake in the comune of Monterotondo Marittimo, in the Province of Grosseto, Tuscany, Italy.

See also
Colline Metallifere

Lakes of Tuscany
Monterotondo Marittimo